This is a list of awards and nominations received by South Korean variety show Running Man.

As of 2021, Running Man has been nominated for 81 awards, winning 59.

SBS Entertainment Awards

Other awards

References 

Running Man (TV series)